CBA may refer to:

Maths and science 
 Casei Bifidus Acidophilus, a bacterium
 Colicin, activity protein
 Complete Boolean algebra, a concept from mathematics
 Cytometric Bead Array, a bead-based immunoassay
 Cell Based Assay, also a kind of immunoassay
 4-Carboxybenzaldehyde, a byproduct in the industrial production of terephthalic acid
 Congenital bronchial atresia, a rare congenital abnormality

Organizations

Academic 
 Catholic Biblical Association
 Center for Bits and Atoms, a research institution at the Massachusetts Institute of Technology, United States
 Christian Brothers Academy, schools run by the Institute of the Brothers of the Christian Schools, including:
 Christian Brothers Academy (New Jersey), in Lincroft, New Jersey
 Christian Brothers Academy (Albany, New York)
 Christian Brothers Academy (Syracuse, New York)
 College of Business Administration (Saudi Arabia), private college in Saudi Arabia
 Corby Business Academy, in Corby, England

Banks 
 Central Bank of Armenia
 Centrale Bank van Aruba, the central bank of Aruba
 Commercial Bank of Africa, headquartered in Nairobi, Kenya
 Commercial Bank of Australia (1866–1982), merged into the Wales bank to form Westpac
 Commonwealth Bank of Australia

Professional and interest 
 California Bluegrass Association
 Cambridge Buddhist Association
 Canadian Bankers Association
 Canadian Bar Association
 CBA (Christian trade association), established in 1950 by bookstores
 Chicago Bar Association
 Chinese Benevolent Association
 Chinese Benevolent Association of Vancouver
 Christian Bowhunters of America
 Commonwealth Broadcasting Association
 Consumer Bankers Association, lobbying voice on retail banking issues in the United States
 Council for British Archaeology

Sports 
 California Basketball Association, the original name the West Coast Conference
 Chinese Badminton Association 
 Chinese Baseball Association
 Chinese Basketball Alliance, a professional men's league (1994 to 1999) in Taiwan
 Chinese Basketball Association, the pre-eminent professional men's basketball league in China
 Chinese Basketball Association (organisation), the national basketball association of China
 Christian Bowhunters of America
 Continental Basketball Association, a defunct professional men's basketball minor league in the United States
 Continental Basketball Association (1969–1974), defunct semi-pro basketball league in the United States
 Continental Basketball Association, a defunct semi-professional men's league, renamed Australian Basketball Association in 1999

Other organizations 
 CBA (food retail), a Hungarian food-retail network
 Companhia Brasileira de Aluminio, the largest aluminium producer in Brazil
 CBA (AM), former CBC Radio One AM station in Moncton, New Brunswick, now known as CBAM-FM
 CBA-FM, the CBC Radio Two station in Moncton
 Central Anticorruption Bureau of Poland
 Commonwealth Broadcasting Association
 Luis A. Ferré Performing Arts Center, a multi-use performance centre in San Juan, Puerto Rico
 Círculo de Bellas Artes, a private, non-profit, cultural organization in Madrid, Spain
 Brilliance China Automotive Holding Limited, a subsidiary of the Chinese Brilliance Auto Group, formerly listed with NYSE ticker symbol: CBA

Other uses 
 Celia Barquín Arozamena (1996–2018), Spanish amateur golfer 
 Chromatic button accordion
 Collective bargaining agreement, a labor contract agreed upon between management and trade unions used in many businesses, including sports leagues such as:
 MLB Collective Bargaining Agreement, in baseball
 NBA Collective Bargaining Agreement, in basketball
 NFL Collective Bargaining Agreement, in American football
 NHL Collective Bargaining Agreement, in ice hockey
 MLS Collective Bargaining Agreement, in soccer
 Community Benefits Agreement
 Computed Buffer Adjustment, a golf scoring adjustment for handicapping purposes
 Consensus-based assessment
 Córdoba, Argentina, a city
 Corpus-based approaches in linguistics research
 Cost–benefit analysis